Colonel Bertram Stuart Trevelyan Archer,  (3 February 1915 – 2 May 2015), known as Stuart Archer, was a recipient of the George Cross, the highest British and Commonwealth award for gallantry not in the face of the enemy. On 3 February 2015 Archer became the first recipient of the Victoria Cross or the George Cross to reach 100 years of age.

Early life
Before joining the army, Archer was a qualified architect with the Royal Institute of British Architects, receiving his certification at the youngest possible age of 21. In July 1936, he started work in Gray's Inn with a firm in which he eventually became a partner and remained with for all of his working life. Upon joining the army, he first served with the Honourable Artillery Company as an enlisted soldier before joining the Royal Engineers, who carried out bomb disposal work in the United Kingdom. He received an emergency commission as a second lieutenant in the Royal Engineers on 30 March 1940, and carried out bomb disposal work from that June. He had dealt with 200 bombs prior to the awarding of the George Cross, and provided the War Office with five different fuses as well as the Zus anti-handling devices.

Award of George Cross and citation
He was awarded the medal on 30 September 1941. The award was for extensive work on defusing German bombs dropped on the United Kingdom during World War II. The original announcement of the award read simply:

The full citation is:

Archer's exploits, including the circumstances of the awarding of the GC, are detailed at length in Danger UXB, a history of wartime bomb disposal by James Owen.

Subsequent career and later life
At the end of the war, Archer was a lieutenant with the war-substantive rank of captain. On 10 March 1951, he was appointed to a regular commission as a captain in the emergency reserves (seniority from 19 May 1946). He was promoted to major on 30 November 1951 and to lieutenant-colonel on 7 February 1955. He was appointed an Officer of the Order of the British Empire (OBE) in the 1961 Birthday Honours. He was promoted lieutenant colonel in the regular army reserve on 1 August.

On 28 October 1963 he was appointed Honorary Colonel of the bomb disposal regiments of the Royal Engineers. He relinquished his appointment as honorary colonel on 31 March 1967.

Archer served as Chairman of the Victoria Cross and George Cross Association from 1994 to 2006, and represented the association at the funeral of the Queen Mother in 2002. He died on 2 May 2015, three months after his 100th birthday.

He was elected a Fellow of the Royal Institute of British Architects in 1970.

See also
List of George Cross recipients

References

Further reading

External links
 Royal Engineers website: History of Bomb Disposal

1915 births
2015 deaths
Architects from London
Fellows of the Royal Institute of British Architects
British centenarians
Men centenarians
British recipients of the George Cross
Officers of the Order of the British Empire
Royal Engineers officers
British Army personnel of World War II
Honourable Artillery Company officers
Bomb disposal personnel
People from Hampstead
Military personnel from London